Vladimir Potemin (born 24 January 1979) is a retired male race walker from Russia.

Achievements

External links 

1979 births
Living people
Russian male racewalkers
Athletes (track and field) at the 2000 Summer Olympics
Olympic athletes of Russia
Universiade medalists in athletics (track and field)
Universiade silver medalists for Russia
Medalists at the 2003 Summer Universiade